The United Friendly Worthing Open was a women's professional golf tournament on the Ladies European Tour held in England. It was played annually between 1982 and 1984 at Hill Barn Golf Club in Worthing, West Sussex.

Winners

Source:

See also
United Friendly Tournament

References

External links
Ladies European Tour

Former Ladies European Tour events
Golf tournaments in England
Defunct sports competitions in England
Recurring sporting events established in 1982
Recurring sporting events disestablished in 1984